In 2018, artist Gus Cutty painted a mural of Dolly Parton on Haywood Road outside Beauty Parade Hair Salon in West Asheville, North Carolina, United States. The portrait replaced another of a girl licking ice cream, and took four days to complete. Cutty modeled the painting after a vintage portrait of the country singer.

In 2021, he added a portrait of RuPaul. Prior to the unveiling, salon owner Terra Marshall asked people to guess the identity of the second portrait.

Reception
John Le of WLOS called the original mural of Dolly "a colorful new artistic landmark ... sure to draw a lot of traffic on social media". Following the addition of RuPaul's image, Donald Padgett of Out said the pairing was "just the type of unity this country needs most right now" and wrote, "The response has been decidedly positive, with even RuPaul giving a big seal of approval to the mural." RuPaul tweeted, "Gorgeous! I hope it's real." Brook Bolen included the painting in Asheville Today 2021 "guide to Asheville, NC's most marvelous murals". Brett White of Decider.com described the mural as "absolutely gorgeous". On season 14 of RuPaul's Drag Race, seven contestants attempted to recreate the painting as part of a mini-challenge.

References

2010s murals
2018 paintings
2020s murals
2021 paintings
Culture of Asheville, North Carolina
Dolly Parton
Murals in North Carolina
Paintings in North Carolina
Paintings of people
RuPaul